Bursa tuberosissima, common name : the yellow mouthed frog shell,  is a species of sea snail, a marine gastropod mollusc in the family Bursidae, the frog shells.

Description
The shell size varies between 20 mm and 62 mm

Distribution
This species is distributed in the seas along the Philippines and Australia.

References

External links
 

Bursidae
Gastropods described in 1844